"Put Your Money on Me" may refer to:
"Put Your Money on Me", a song by The Struts from the album Everybody Wants,
"Put Your Money on Me", a song by Arcade Fire from the album Everything Now.